Gharibabad-e Nark (also Romanized as Gharībābād-e Nark; also known as Gharībābād) is a village in Nazil Rural District, Nukabad District, Khash County, Sistan and Baluchestan Province, Iran. At the 2006 census, its population was 35, in 8 families.

References 

Populated places in Khash County